Antanas Venclova (7 January 1906 – 28 June 1971) was a Soviet and Lithuanian politician, poet, journalist and translator.

Early life 
Born in Trempiniai in Suwałki Governorate, Venclova studied Lithuanian, Russian and French at the Vytautas Magnus University in Kaunas. In 1936, he visited the Soviet Union, becoming fascinated with the Soviet system and its culture. Before the outbreak of World War II, he worked as a teacher and was the editor of the procommunist journals Trečias frontas (Third Front) and Prošvaistė.

Politician 

Following the Soviet occupation of Lithuania in 1940, he was briefly appointed as Minister of Education of the Lithuanian SSR. He was elected as a representative to the "People's Seimas" and went to Moscow as part of the delegation requesting that Lithuania be incorporated into the Soviet Union. After the German invasion of the Soviet Union in 1941, he retreated with the Red Army and remained in Soviet Russia during the Nazi occupation, returning to Lithuania in 1944.

In the following years, he faithfully served the Soviet government.

In 1947, he received the Stalin Prize. Venclova wrote the original words for the anthem of the Lithuanian SSR and translated the lyrics of the Soviet anthem into Lithuanian. After Joseph Stalin's death, the second stanza of the Lithuanian anthem's lyrics was changed by Vacys Reimeris to remove any mention of Stalin. Between 1954 and 1959, Venclova was Chairman of the Lithuanian Writer's Union. He died in Vilnius in 1971.

Family 
His son, the poet Tomas Venclova, was a prominent dissident.

References 

1906 births
1971 deaths
20th-century Lithuanian writers
20th-century poets
20th-century translators
People from Kalvarija Municipality
People from Suwałki Governorate
Communist Party of Lithuania politicians
First convocation members of the Supreme Soviet of the Soviet Union
Second convocation members of the Supreme Soviet of the Soviet Union
Third convocation members of the Supreme Soviet of the Soviet Union
Fourth convocation members of the Supreme Soviet of the Soviet Union
Fifth convocation members of the Supreme Soviet of the Soviet Union
Members of the Supreme Soviet of the Lithuanian Soviet Socialist Republic
Ministers of Education of Lithuania
Vytautas Magnus University alumni
Stalin Prize winners
Recipients of the Order of Lenin
Recipients of the Order of the Red Banner of Labour
Socialist realism writers
Translators of Alexander Pushkin
Lithuanian literary critics
Lithuanian male poets
Lithuanian translators
Soviet male poets
Soviet politicians
Soviet propagandists
Soviet translators
Burials at Antakalnis Cemetery